This is a list of the pollen beetles (family Nitidulidae) recorded in Great Britain. For other beetles, see List of beetle species recorded in Britain.

Urophorus humeralis (Fabricius, 1798)
Carpophilus dimidiatus (Fabricius, 1792)
Carpophilus flavipes Murray, 1864
Carpophilus hemipterus (Linnaeus, 1758)
Carpophilus ligneus Murray, 1864
Carpophilus maculatus Murray, 1864
Carpophilus marginellus Motschulsky, 1858
Carpophilus mutilatus Erichson, 1843
Carpophilus nepos Murray, 1864
Carpophilus obsoletus Erichson, 1843
Carpophilus sexpustulatus (Fabricius, 1792)
Carpophilus truncatus Murray, 1864
Epuraea aestiva (Linnaeus, 1758)
Epuraea angustula Sturm, 1844
Epuraea biguttata (Thunberg, 1784)
Epuraea binotata Reitter, 1872
Epuraea distincta (Grimmer, 1841)
Epuraea fuscicollis (Stephens, 1835)
Epuraea guttata (Olivier, 1811)
Epuraea longula Erichson, 1845
Epuraea marseuli Reitter, 1872
Epuraea melina Erichson, 1843
Epuraea neglecta (Heer, 1841)
Epuraea pallescens (Stephens, 1835)
Epuraea rufomarginata (Stephens, 1830)
Epuraea silacea (Herbst, 1783)
Epuraea terminalis (Mannerheim, 1843)
Epuraea thoracica Tournier, 1872
Epuraea variegata (Herbst, 1793)
Epuraea limbata (Fabricius, 1787)
Micrurula melanocephala (Marsham, 1802)
Pria dulcamarae (Scopoli, 1763)
Meligethes aeneus (Fabricius, 1775)
Meligethes atramentarius Förster, 1849
Meligethes atratus (Olivier, 1790)
Meligethes bidens Brisout de Barneville, 1863
Meligethes bidentatus Brisout de Barneville, 1863
Meligethes brevis Sturm, 1845
Meligethes brunnicornis Sturm, 1845
Meligethes carinulatus Förster, 1849
Meligethes coracinus Sturm, 1845
Meligethes corvinus Erichson, 1845
Meligethes difficilis (Heer, 1841)
Meligethes erichsonii Brisout de Barneville, 1863
Meligethes exilis Sturm, 1845
Meligethes flavimanus Stephens, 1830
Meligethes fulvipes Brisout de Barneville, 1863
Meligethes gagathinus Erichson, 1845
Meligethes haemorrhoidalis Förster, 1849
Meligethes incanus Sturm, 1845
Meligethes kunzei Erichson, 1845
Meligethes lugubris Sturm, 1845
Meligethes morosus Erichson, 1845
Meligethes nanus Erichson, 1845
Meligethes nigrescens Stephens, 1830
Meligethes obscurus Erichson, 1845
Meligethes ochropus Sturm, 1845
Meligethes ovatus Sturm, 1845
Meligethes pedicularius (Gyllenhal, 1808)
Meligethes persicus (Faldermann, 1835)
Meligethes planiusculus (Heer, 1841)
Meligethes rotundicollis Brisout de Barneville, 1863
Meligethes ruficornis (Marsham, 1802)
Meligethes serripes (Gyllenhal, 1827)
Meligethes solidus (Kugelann, 1794)
Meligethes subrugosus (Gyllenhal, 1808)
Meligethes umbrosus Sturm, 1845
Meligethes viridescens (Fabricius, 1787)
Nitidula bipunctata (Linnaeus, 1758)
Nitidula carnaria (Schaller, 1783)
Nitidula flavomaculata Rossi, 1790
Nitidula rufipes (Linnaeus, 1767)
Omosita colon (Linnaeus, 1758)
Omosita depressa (Linnaeus, 1758)
Omosita discoidea (Fabricius, 1775)
Soronia grisea (Linnaeus, 1758)
Soronia punctatissima (Illiger, 1794)
Amphotis marginata (Fabricius, 1781)
Cychramus luteus (Fabricius, 1787)
Pocadius adustus Reitter, 1888
Pocadius ferrugineus (Fabricius, 1775)
Thalycra fervida (Olivier, 1790)
Cryptarcha strigata (Fabricius, 1787)
Cryptarcha undata (Olivier, 1790)
Glischrochilus quadripunctatus (Linnaeus, 1758)
Glischrochilus hortensis (Geoffroy in Fourcroy, 1785)
Glischrochilus quadriguttatus (Fabricius, 1777)
Pityophagus ferrugineus (Linnaeus, 1761)
Cybocephalus fodori Endrödy-Younga, 1965

References

Pollen beetles